Pakundia Municipality (also known as Pakundia Pourasabha, Pakundia Paurashava) is a town and municipality in Pakundia, Kishoreganj, Dhaka Division, Bangladesh. The municipality was established on 30 March 2007. The municipality has a population of 28,773 residents.

Education

College 

 Pakundia Adarsha Mohila College
 Pakundia Government College

Mayor of Pakundia 
Current mayor of Pakundia Municipality is Md. Aktaruzzaman Khokon.

See also 
 List of cities and towns in Bangladesh
 List of municipal corporations in Bangladesh
 Pakundia Adarsha Mohila College

References

External links 
 

2007 establishments in Bangladesh
Towns in Bangladesh